Abhijit Vaghani is an Indian film score composer, music composer and music producer.

Personal life
Abhijit Vaghani is a Gujarati. He received a diploma in Sound Engineering from the School of Audio Engineering (SAE), London.

Music career
Abhijit Vaghani has produced music for Hindi films like 'Dishoom', 'Azhar', 'Ki & Ka', 'Sarbjit', 'Airlift' and 'Bajrangi Bhaijaan' and composed the background score for 50 films, He debuted as a music composer with the single, 'Pyaar Manga Hai'. His other notable works are the remixing popular Hindi retro songs like "Pal Pal Dil Ke Paas" and "Halka Halka Suroor".

As music producer

As music director

Singles

Film

For background score

Music influences

Vaghani is inspired by works of notable Indian musicians like RD Burman, Bappi Lahiri and AR Rahman.

Accolades

Vaghani was nominated for the Best Music Arranger and Programmer award by Global Indian Music Academy Awards for his Music arrangements and programming for the Bollywood film Ra.One in 2012.

References

External links
 

Living people
Gujarati people
Indian film score composers
Musicians from Gujarat
Music directors
Indian Muslims
Musicians from Mumbai
Converts to Islam from Hinduism
Year of birth missing (living people)